Ara or ara may refer to:

Places
Ara (mountain), a stratovolcanic cone in Kotayk Province, Armenia 
Arayi, Armenia, a village formerly known as Ara
Arrah, Bihar, India, a city and a municipal corporation, sometimes transliterated as Ara
Ara, Jharkhand, a census town in Jharkhand, India
Ara, Ranchi, a census town in Jharkhand, India
Ara, Iran, a village
'Ara, Israel, a village
Ara (lake), Norway
Ara Pacis, an altar in Rome dedicated to Pax, the Roman goddess of Peace
Arakawa River (disambiguation), also known as Ara, several rivers in Japan
River Ara, Ireland

People
 Ara Ara, a variant name of the Gayiri people of Queensland, Australia

Given name
Ara the Beautiful, a legendary Armenian hero
Ara Ball, Canadian film director
Ara Bartlett (fl. 1825–1880), American lawyer and judge
Ara Dinkjian (born 1958), Armenian oud player and composer
Go Ara (born 1990), South Korean actress and model
Ara Parseghian (1923–2017), American football player and coach
Yoo Ara (born 1992), South Korean singer and dancer; leader of the girl group Hello Venus
Ara Guler (1928-2018), Armenian-Turkish photojournalist
Ara, a diminutive of the Russian feminine given name Avrora (a form of Aurora)
Ara Spence (1793–1866), Justice of the Maryland Court of Appeals

Surname
Arilena Ara (born 1998), Albanian singer also known mononymously as Arilena
Guido Ara (1888–1975), Italian association football player
Rachel Ara (born 1965), British conceptual and data artist
Seiji Ara (born 1974), Japanese race car driver
Zinat Ara (born 1953), Bangladeshi justice

Media
Ara (film), a 2008 Turkish drama directed by Ümit Ünal
Ara (newspaper), a Catalan-language daily newspaper from Barcelona

Music
"Ara", a song by Brymo from The Son of a Kapenta

Other uses
A'ra, a pre-Islamic Arabian god
Ara (goddess), a Mesopotamian goddess
Ara (constellation)
Ara (drink), traditional Bhutanese wine
Ara (fish) (Niphon spinosus), a species of grouper from the family Serranidae
Ara (bird), a genus of macaw (parrot)
L-arabinose operon, also known as ara
ISO 639-2 and -3 language codes for Arabic
Ara Institute of Canterbury, Christchurch, New Zealand
Project Ara, a modular phone initiative by Google

See also
ARA (disambiguation) (acronym)
Ara Gaya, a city-state kingdom in the Gaya confederacy, in modern-day Haman County, South Korea
Arra (disambiguation)
Arrah (disambiguation)
McAra (disambiguation)

Bengali Muslim surnames